The Abraxini are a tribe of geometer moths in the subfamily Ennominae. Here, the Cassymini are considered a specialized offshoot of the Abraxini and merged therein; some authors consider them a distinct tribe however.

Genera
As numerous ennominae genera have not yet been assigned to a tribe, the genus list is preliminary. Most of the genera listed here would be placed in the Cassymini if these are considered separate.
 Abraxas
 Magpie, Abraxas grossulariata
 Clouded magpie, Abraxas sylvata
 Auzeodes
 Ballantiophora
 Berberodes
 Cassyma
 Danala
 Gyostega
 Heterostegane
 Hydatocapnia
 Leuciris
 Ligdia
 Scorched carpet, Ligdia adustata
 Lomaspilis
 Clouded border, Lomaspilis marginata
 Ninodes
 Orthocabera (tentatively placed here)
 Peratophyga
 Pristostegania
 Protitame
 Pycnostega
 Stegania
 Syngonorthus
 Xenostega
 Zamarada (tentatively placed here)

Heliomata, otherwise placed in the Macariini, might also belong here.

References

External links

  (2008): Family group names in Geometridae. Retrieved July 22, 2008.
  (1994): The Moths of Borneo: Family Geometridae, Subfamily Ennominae. London.
  (2008): Markku Savela's Lepidoptera and some other life forms: Ennominae. Version of March 8, 2008. Retrieved July 21, 2008.
  (2008): Characterisation of the Australian Nacophorini using adult morphology, and phylogeny of the Geometridae based on morphological characters. Zootaxa 1736: 1-141.

 
Moth tribes